David John Hay  (born ) is a New Zealand politician and businessman. He served as mayor of Mt Roskill from 1987 to 1989, and deputy mayor of Auckland City on three occasions (1991–1998, 2001–2004, and 2007–2010). He was also an Auckland Regional Councillor between 2004 and 2007. He is the managing director of Keith Hay Homes Limited, founded by his father.

Early life and family
He attended Mount Roskill Grammar School, andgraduated from the University of Auckland with a commerce degree, and obtained accountancy and chartered secretarial qualifications from Auckland Institute of Technology.

Local-body politics
In 1983, Hay was elected as a member of the Mount Roskill Borough Council, and served as mayor of that borough between 1987 and 1989, when it was absorbed into Auckland City. He was subsequently elected to the Auckland City Council on the Citizens & Ratepayers ticket, and served as deputy mayor between 1991 and 1998 under Les Mills, and from 2001 to 2004 and 2007 to 2010 under John Banks. 

His achievements on council included the restoration of the Civic Theatre and the establishment of Metrowater, and he supported the formation of the Auckland supercity. In the early 1990s, Hay opposed the gay pride 'Hero parade' on the grounds of taste and public decency, stating: "If it was the Girl Guides behaving like that, I'd object."  Hay was elected to the Auckland Regional Council in 2004, and served one three-year term. He did not seek election to the new Auckland Council in 2010.

Business career
Hay has been involved with the housing construction company founded by his father, Keith Hay Homes Limited, since 1972, rising to become managing director of the firm.

Honours
In the 2011 New Year Honours, Hay was appointed a Companion of the New Zealand Order of Merit for services to local-body affairs and the community.

Personality and beliefs
Hay is known for his dry sense of humour and Christian values and principles.

References

1940s births
Living people
University of Auckland alumni
Auckland University of Technology alumni
Mayors of places in the Auckland Region
Deputy mayors of places in New Zealand
Auckland City Councillors
Auckland regional councillors
New Zealand businesspeople
Companions of the New Zealand Order of Merit
People educated at Mount Roskill Grammar School